Inquisitr, a website started in 2007 for news and entertainment stories, was relaunched in May 2011. It is owned and operated by Inquisitr Ltd.

History
The web domain for Inquisitr was registered in Iceland on August 6, 2007. The company was founded by former TechCrunch journalist Duncan Riley, whose history of launching web businesses includes the Blog Herald, launched in 2002. In 2004, he launched the blog network Weblog Empire, which in 2005, served as the base site for b5media LLC, of which Riley was a co-founder. The company went on to earn $15 million in profits before eventually being sold at a loss. Riley left the company with an undisclosed settlement after protesting the poor pay of its employees. Inquisitr was eventually put up for sale in 2011, with Riley citing personal reasons for the sale.

The current website owner, Daniel Treisman, purchased the website via Flippa.com and invested into growing the company.

Growth
In an interview with AdExchanger the owner of Inquisitr says they have been working with ad network company Komoona since 2013.

"[We] find it challenging to devote the time needed to find the right monetization partners and strategies," Treisman said. "There are a lot of moving parts and it feels like we are leaving money on the table due to the lack of time and know-how."

In an interview with Digiday, CEO Dominick Miserandino reported one of the top traffic sources as Flipboard.

In 2018, CEO Dominick Miserandino started and moved the publication from loss to a profit by 2020. They moved more from aggregation to traditional news in 2020.

References

External links

Aggregation websites
Mass media companies established in 2007
Newsgroups
2011 mergers and acquisitions
2007 establishments in Iceland